Church of Our Saviour is a historic Episcopal church located at Lebanon Springs in the town of New Lebanon, Columbia County, New York. It was built between 1872 and 1881, and is a simple stone and wooden building in the English Gothic Revival style.  It consists of a rectangular nave, rear chancel, side vestibule and small, rear sacristy.  The building features a steep slate roof, three stage bell tower, and lancet-arched windows.  Also on the property are a contributing rectory (c. 1890) and garage (1934).

It was listed on the National Register of Historic Places in 1997.

References

External links

Church of Our Saviour website

Churches on the National Register of Historic Places in New York (state)
Episcopal church buildings in New York (state)
Gothic Revival church buildings in New York (state)
Churches completed in 1872
19th-century Episcopal church buildings
Churches in Columbia County, New York
National Register of Historic Places in Columbia County, New York